The 7th Aviation Corps was an aviation corps established in 1953. It was formed by order from February 5, 1953, with command in Zemun as join unit composed from three aviation divisions and one aviation technical division. Corps was disbanded by order from June 27, 1959, with the "Drvar" reorganization of the Air Force.

Organization
Liaison Squadron of 7th Aviation Corps
112th Signal Battalion
103rd Reconnaissance Aviation Regiment
211st Air Reconnaissance Regiment (1955–1959)
29th Aviation Division
39th Aviation Division
44th Aviation Division
48th Aviation Technical Division

Commanding officers
Božo Lazarević

Political Commissars
Nenad Drakulić

Chiefs of Staff
Ljubomir Popadić	
Vladimir Bakarić

References

Corps of Yugoslav Air Force
Military units and formations established in 1953